Germering (Central Bavarian: Geamaring) is a town of approximately 40,500 within the district of Fürstenfeldbruck, in Bavaria, Germany. It is directly adjacent to the city of Munich and borders it to the west.

History
The area of 
Germering has an old history attested by findings of burial mounds of the New Stone Age and the Bronze Age, as well as a "villa rustica" (as in nearby Leutstetten) built by the Romans. There was a trade route through the city with numerous brick kilns. After their discovery a glass roof was erected over one (near the Nebelerstrasse) so one can still view it.

Germering was first reliably mentioned about 859-864 A.D. In those days it was still known as Kermeringon, but apparently it was formerly mentioned under the name Germana vel admonte. Unterpfaffenhofen, the south-west part of Germering, was first named in a charter dated 1190, but both villages remained small and rural until they experienced several significant increases in population during the 20th century.

During World War II, a subcamp of the Dachau concentration camp was located in the town.

In 1978, the two independent towns Unterpfaffenhofen and Germering were merged to form present-day Germering. The new city coat of arms was created in 1981 by Karl Haas, who incorporated the coats of arms of both former boroughs.

Honorary citizens
 Claudia Hengst (born 1969), well-known disabled sportswoman and multiple gold medal winner at the Paralympics, world and European champion, honorary citizen since 2001
 Robert Huber (born 1937), residing in Germering, received the Nobel Prize for Chemistry in 1988 and was appointed honorary citizen in the same year

Notable people

 Peter Brugger (born 1972), singer and guitarist, member of the Sportfreunde Stiller
 Lena Dürr, alpine skier, grew up in Germering
  (born 1963), actor (including Lindenstrasse and The Great Bellheim)
 Carl Spitzweg (1808–1885), Biedermeier-era artist, born in the town-district Unterpfaffenhofen

Personalities who have worked on the ground

 Gus Backus (1937–2019) American singer, lived in Germering until his death
 Heinz Braun (1938–1986), painter, lived in Germering
 John Christopher Howland (1928–2013), singer, actor and entertainer, lived in Germering (Harthaus)
 Siegfried Lowitz (1914–1999), actor, lived in Germering
 Harry Thumann (1952-2001), synthesizer composer, founded his Country Lane Studios in Germering in 1973, and owned it until 1983.
 Erhard Wunderlich (1956–2012), handball player, silver medal winner at the Summer olympics 1984, lived in Germering

References

External links

Fürstenfeldbruck (district)